The Mojave Desert is a desert in the rain shadow of the southern Sierra Nevada mountains and Transverse Ranges in the Southwestern United States. It is named for the indigenous Mojave people. It is located primarily in southeastern California and southwestern Nevada, with small portions extending into Arizona and Utah.

The Mojave Desert, together with the Sonoran, Chihuahuan, and Great Basin deserts, forms a larger North American Desert. Of these, the Mojave is the smallest and driest. The Mojave Desert displays typical basin and range topography, generally having a pattern of a series of parallel mountain ranges and valleys. It is also the site of Death Valley, which is the lowest elevation in North America. It supports a diversity of flora and fauna.

The  desert supports a number of human activities, including recreation, ranching, and military training. The Mojave Desert also contains various silver, tungsten, iron and gold deposits.

The spelling Mojave originates from the Spanish language, while the spelling Mohave comes from modern English. Both are used today, although the Mojave Tribal Nation officially uses the spelling Mojave.

Geography

The Mojave Desert is a desert bordered to the west by the Sierra Nevada mountain range and the California montane chaparral and woodlands, and to the south and east by the Sonoran Desert. The boundaries to the east of the Mojave Desert are less distinctive than the other boundaries because there is no presence of an indicator species, such as the Joshua tree (Yucca brevifolia), which is endemic to the Mojave Desert. The Mojave Desert is distinguished from the Sonoran Desert and other deserts adjacent to it by its warm temperate climate, as well as flora and fauna such as ironwood (Olneya tesota), blue Palo Verde (Parkinsonia florida), chuparosa (Justicia californica), spiny menodora (Menodora spinescens), desert senna (Cassia armata), California dalea (Psorothamnus arborescens), and goldenhead (Acamptopappus shockleyi). Along with these other factors, these plants differentiate the Mojave from the nearby Sonoran desert.

The Mojave Desert is bordered by the San Andreas fault to the Southwest and the Garlock fault to the North. The mountains elevated along the length of the San Andreas fault provide a clear border between the Mojave desert and the coastal regions to the West. The Garlock fault separates the Mojave Desert from the Sierra Nevada and Tehachapi mountains, which provide a natural border to the Mojave Desert. There are also abundant alluvial fans, which are called bajadas, that form around the mountains within the Mojave desert and extend down toward the low altitude basins, which contain dried lake beds called playas, where water generally collects and evaporates, leaving large volumes of salt. These playas include Rogers Dry Lake, and China Lake. Dry lakes are a noted feature of the Mojave landscape. The Devil's Playground is a part of the Mojave National Preserve and is between the town of Baker, California and Providence Mountains. The Cronese Mountains are within the Devil's Playground.

There are very few surface rivers in the Mojave Desert, even given the low precipitation level: two major rivers generally flow underground. The intermittent Mojave River, which begins in the San Bernardino mountains and disappears underground in the Mojave Desert. The Amargosa River also flows partly underground through the Mojave Desert along a southward path. The Manix, Mojave, and the Little Mojave lakes are all large but shallow. Soda Lake is the principal saline basin of the Mojave desert. Natural springs are typically rare throughout the Mojave desert, however, there are two notable springs, Ash Meadows, and Oasis Valley. Ash Meadows is formed from several other springs, which all draw from deep underground. Oasis Valley draws from the nearby Amargosa River.

Climate 
Extremes in temperatures throughout the seasons characterize the climate of the Mojave Desert. Freezing temperatures as well as strong winds are not uncommon in the winter, as well as precipitation such as rain and snow in the mountains. In contrast, temperatures above  are not uncommon during the summer months. Most of the precipitation in the Mojave comes from the Pacific Cyclonic storms that are generally present passing Eastward in November to April. Such storms generally bring rain and snow only in the mountainous regions, as a result of the effect of the mountains, which creates a drying effect on its leeward slopes.

During the late summer months, there is also the possibility of strong thunderstorms, which bring heavy showers or cloudbursts. These storms can result in flash flooding.

The Mojave Desert has not historically supported a fire regime because of low fuel loads and connectivity. However, in the last few decades, invasive annual plants such as some within the genera Bromus, Schismus and Brassica have facilitated fires by serving as a fuel bed for fires. This has significantly altered many areas of the desert. At higher elevations, fire regimes are regular but infrequent.

Cities and regions 

While the Mojave Desert is generally sparsely populated, it has increasingly become urbanized in recent years. The metropolitan areas include Las Vegas, the largest urban area in the Mojave and the largest urban area in Nevada with a population of about 2.3 million. St. George, Utah, is the northeasternmost metropolitan area in the Mojave, with a population of around 180,000 in 2020, and is located at the convergence of the Mojave, Great Basin, and Colorado Plateau. The Los Angeles exurban area of Lancaster-Palmdale has more than 400,000 residents, and the Victorville area to its east has more than 300,000 residents. Smaller cities or micropolitan areas in the Mojave Desert include Helendale, Lake Havasu City, Kingman, Laughlin, Bullhead City and Pahrump. All have experienced rapid population growth since 1990. The California portion of the desert also contains Edwards Air Force Base and Naval Air Weapons Station China Lake, noted for experimental aviation and weapons projects.

The Mojave Desert has several ghost towns. The most significant are the silver and copper-mining town of Calico, California, and the old railroad depot of Kelso, California. Some of the other ghost towns are more modern, created when U.S. Route 66 (and the lesser-known U.S. Route 91) were abandoned in favor of the construction of Interstates.

Geology 

The rock that forms the Mojave Desert was likely created under shallow water in the Precambrian. Under this shallow coat of water, a large volume of sedimentary processes were likely taking place, causing in large deposits of limestones, silicates, and dolomites. During the Paleozoic era, the area that is now the Mojave was again likely submerged under a greater sea. During the Mesozoic era, major tectonic activities such as thrust faulting and folding resulted in distinctive shaping as well as intrusion. During the Cenozoic, more tectonic deformation occurred whilst the Mojave was partly submerged. Major volcanic activity is thought to have occurred during the Oligocene. Large downpours during the Miocene likely significantly eroded the rock in the Mojave and accelerated deposition.

The Mojave Desert is a source of various minerals and metallic materials. Due to the climate, there is an accumulation of weathered bedrock, fine sand and silt, both sand and silt sediments becoming converted into colluvium. The deposits of gold, tungsten, and silver have been mined frequently prior to the Second World War. Additionally, there have been deposits of copper, tin, lead-zinc, manganese, iron, and various radioactive substances but they have not been mined for commercial use.

Ecology

Flora
The flora of the Mojave desert consists of various endemic plant species, notably the Joshua Tree, which is a notable endemic and indicator species of the desert. There is more endemic flora in the Mojave desert than almost anywhere in the world. Mojave Desert flora is not a vegetation type, although the plants in the area have evolved in isolation because of the physical barriers of the Sierra Nevadas and the Colorado Plateau. Predominant plants of the Mojave desert include all-scale (Atriplex polycarpa), creosote bush (Larrea tridentata), brittlebush (Encelia farinosa), desert holly (Atriplex hymenelytra), white burrobush (Hymenoclea salsola), and most notably, the Joshua tree (Yucca brevifolia). Additionally, the Mojave desert is also home to various species of cacti, such as silver cholla (Cylindropuntia echinocarpa), Mojave prickly pear (O. erinacea), beavertail cactus (O. basilaris), and many-headed barrel cactus (Echinocactus polycephalus). Less common but distinctive plants of the Mojave desert include ironwood (Olneya tesota), blue Palo Verde (Parkinsonia Florida), chuparosa (Justicia californica), spiny menodora (Menodora spinescens), desert senna (Cassia armata), California dalea (Psorothamnus arborescens), and goldenhead (Acamptopappus shockleyi). The Mojave desert is generally abundant in winter annuals. The plants of the Mojave desert each generally correspond to an individual geographic feature. As such, there are distinctive flora communities within the desert.

Fauna

Notable species of the Mojave desert include bighorn sheep (Ovis canadensis), mountain lions (Puma concolor), black-tailed jackrabbits (Lepus californicus), and desert tortoises (Gopherus agassizii). Various other species are particularly common in the Mojave Desert, such as the LeConte's thrasher (Toxostoma lecontei), banded gecko (Coleonyx variegatus), desert iguana (Dipsosaurus dorsalis), chuckwalla (Sauromalus obesus), and regal horned lizard (Phrynosoma solare). Species of snake include the rosy boa (Lichanura trivirgata), Western patch-nosed snake (Salvadora hexalepis), and Mojave rattlesnake (Crotalus scutulatus). These species can also occur in the neighboring Sonoran and Great Basin deserts.

The animal species of the Mojave Desert have generally fewer endemics than its flora. However, endemic fauna of the Mojave Desert include Kelso Dunes jerusalem cricket (Ammopelmatus kelsoensis), the Kelso Dunes shieldback katydid (Eremopedes kelsoensis), the Mohave ground squirrel (Spermophilus Mohavensis) and Amargosa vole (Microtus californicus scirpensis). The Mojave fringe-toed lizard (Uma Scoparia) is not endemic, but almost completely limited to the Mojave desert. There are also aquatic species that are found nowhere else, such as the Devils Hole pupfish, limited to one hot spring near Death Valley.

In society

History 
Before the European exploration of North America, tribes of Native Americans, such as the Mohave, were hunter-gatherers living in the Mojave Desert.

European explorers started exploring the deserts beginning in the 18th century. Francisco Garcés, a Franciscan friar, was the first explorer of the Mojave desert in 1776. Garcés recorded information about the original inhabitants of the deserts.

Later, as American interests expanded into California, American explorers started probing the California deserts. Jedediah Smith travelled through the Mojave deserts in 1826, finally reaching the San Gabriel Mission.

Human development 
In recent years, human development in the Mojave desert has become increasingly present. Human development at the major urban and suburban centers of Las Vegas and Los Angeles has had an increasingly damaging effect on the wildlife of the Mojave Desert. An added demand for landfill space as a result of the large metropolitan centers of Las Vegas and Los Angeles also has the real potential to drastically affect flora and fauna of the Mojave Desert. Agricultural development along the Colorado river, close to the Eastern boundary of the Mojave Desert, also causes habitat loss and degradation. Areas that are particularly affected by human development include Ward Valley and Riverside county. The United States military also maintains installations in the Mojave Desert, making the Mojave a critical training location for the United States Department of Defense. The Mojave Desert has long been a valuable resource for people, and as its human population grows, its importance will only grow. Miners, ranchers, and farmers rely on the desert for a living. The desert is also helping California meet its renewable energy objectives: the desert is an excellent place to site wind and solar energy systems, although they can cause their own environmental impact.

Tourism 

The Mojave Desert is one of the most popular spots for tourism in North America, primarily because of the international destination of Las Vegas. The Mojave is also known for its scenery, playing host to Death Valley National Park, Joshua Tree National Park, and the Mojave National Preserve. Lakes Mead, Mohave, and Havasu provide water sports recreation, and vast off-road areas entice off-road enthusiasts. The Mojave Desert also includes three California State Parks, the Antelope Valley California Poppy Reserve, in Lancaster, Saddleback Butte State Park, in Hi Vista and Red Rock Canyon State Park. Mojave Narrows Park, operated by San Bernardino County, is a former ranch along the Mojave River. 

Several attractions and natural features are in the Calico Mountains. Calico Ghost Town, in Yermo, is administered by San Bernardino County. The ghost town has several shops and attractions and inspired Walter Knott to build Knott's Berry Farm. The Bureau of Land Management also administers Rainbow Basin and Owl Canyon. The Calico Early Man Site, in the Calico Hills east of Yermo, is believed by some archaeologists, including the late Louis Leakey, to show the earliest evidence with lithic stone tools found here of human activity in North America.

Conservation status 

The Mojave Desert has a relatively stable and intact conservation status. The Mojave Desert is one of the best protected distinct ecoregions in the United States, as a result of the California Desert Protection Act, which established the Death Valley, Joshua Tree National Parks and the Mojave National Preserve. However, the southwest and central east portions of the Mojave Desert are particularly threatened as a result of off-road vehicles, human development, and agricultural grazing. The World Wildlife Fund lists the Mojave Desert as relatively "stable/intact".

Various habitats and regions of the Mojave Desert have been protected by statute. Notably, Joshua Tree National Park, Death Valley National Park, and the Mojave National Preserve by the California Desert Protection Act of 1994. (Pub.L. 103–433). Various other national parks and state parks have regions within the Mojave Desert. These include Antelope Valley California Poppy Reserve, which protects the fields of California poppies, Desert Tortoise Natural Area, Arthur B. Ripley Desert Woodland State Park, Desert National Wildlife Refuge, Lake Mead National Recreation Area, Providence Mountains State Recreation Area, Red Cliffs National Conservation Area, Red Rock Canyon State Park, Saddleback Butte State Park, Snow Canyon State Park and Valley of Fire State Park.

2009 litigation 
In 2009, U.S. District Judge Susan Illston ruled against the Bureau's proposed designation of additional off-road vehicle use allowance in the western Mojave Desert. According to the ruling, the Bureau of Land Management violated its own regulations when it designated approximately 5,000 miles (8,000 km) of off-roading routes in 2006. According to Judge Illston, the Bureau's designation was significantly "flawed because it does not contain a reasonable range of alternatives" to limit damage to sensitive habitats. Judge Illston found the bureau had inadequately analyzed the routes' impacts on air quality, soils, plant communities, riparian habitats, and sensitive species such as the endangered Mojave fringe-toed lizard, pointing out that the desert and its resources are "extremely fragile, easily scarred, and slowly healed".

In popular culture 
Three music videos and a video game take place in or around the Mojave Desert:
 "Say You'll Be There" by the Spice Girls
 "Goodbye" by Mimi Webb
 "Fallout New Vegas" Video game released in 2011 takes place in a Post-Apocalyptic Mojave Desert

Notes

References

External links

 The Nature Explorers Mojave Desert Expedition - 1 hour 27 minute ecosystem video in July
 Mojave Desert images at bioimages.vanderbilt.edu
 Mojave Desert Blog
 Mojave Desert Catalog Project

 
Deserts and xeric shrublands in the United States
Ecoregions of California
Ecoregions of the United States
 
Deserts of California
Deserts of Arizona
Deserts of Nevada
Deserts of Utah
Deserts of the Lower Colorado River Valley
Deserts of North America
Geography of Clark County, Nevada
Geography of Inyo County, California
Geography of Kern County, California
Geography of Lincoln County, Nevada
Geography of Los Angeles County, California
Geography of Mohave County, Arizona
Geography of Nye County, Nevada
Geography of San Bernardino County, California
Geography of Washington County, Utah
Geography of Southern California
Southwestern United States